Scott Keltie Glacier is a very small glacier discharging into Robertson Bay between Penelope Point and Egeberg Glacier, on the north coast of Victoria Land. First charted by the British Antarctic Expedition, 1898–1900, under C.E. Borchgrevink. He named it for Sir John Scott Keltie, Secretary of the Royal Geographical Society.

References

Glaciers of Pennell Coast